Delta of Venus is a book of fifteen short stories by Anaïs Nin published posthumously in 1977—though largely written in the 1940s as erotica for a private collector.

In 1994 a film inspired by the book was directed by Zalman King.

Background
The collection of short stories that makes up this anthology was written during the 1940s for a private client known simply as "Collector". This "Collector" commissioned Nin, along with other now well-known writers (including Henry Miller and the poet George Barker), to produce erotic fiction for his private consumption. His identity has since been revealed as Roy M. Johnson (1881–1960), a wealthy American businessman from Ardmore, Oklahoma, who had discovered the Healdton Oil Pool.

Despite being told to leave poetic language aside and concentrate on graphic, sexually explicit scenarios, Nin was able to give these stories a literary flourish and a layer of images and ideas beyond the pornographic. In her Diary (Oct. 1941), she jokingly referred to herself as "the madam of this snobbish literary house of prostitution, from which vulgarity was excluded".

While using the Kama Sutra and other writings such as those of Krafft-Ebing as models, Nin was very conscious that the languages of male and female sexuality were distinct. Although at times she scorned her erotica, and feared for their impact on her literary reputation, they have subsequently been seen by sex-positive feminists as pioneering work.

Short stories
The short stories which Delta of Venus anthologizes are these:
 The Hungarian Adventurer
 Mathilde
 The Boarding School
 The Ring
 Mallorca
 Artists and Models
 Lilith
 Marianne
 The Veiled Woman
 Elena
 The Basque and Bijou
 Pierre
 Manuel
 Linda
 Marcel
The book, unlike the later Little Birds, contains no poetry as such. Its introductory preface contains entries from her Diary, which expressed her hope that its unexpurgated version would one day be published.

See also
D. H. Lawrence
Émile Zola
George Sand
Mons pubis

References

Further reading
 Elizabeth Kowaleski-Wallace, Encyclopedia of Feminist Literary Theory, Taylor & Francis, 1997, p. 190
 Andrew Gibson, Postmodernity, Ethics and the Novel: from Leavis to Levinas, Routledge, 1999, p. 177
 Noël Riley Fitch, Anaïs: The Erotic Life of Anaïs Nin (Boston: Little, Brown and Company, 1993) 
 Anaïs Nin, Delta of Venus, Penguin Books, 2008 

1977 short story collections
Books adapted into films
Books published posthumously
Erotic short stories
Short story collections by Anaïs Nin
American short story collections